NAN-190 is a drug and research chemical widely used in scientific studies. It was previously believed to act as a selective 5-HT1A receptor antagonist, but a subsequent discovery showed that it also potently blocks the α2-adrenergic receptor. The new finding has raised significant concerns about studies using NAN-190 as a specific serotonin receptor antagonist.

References

5-HT1A antagonists
Abandoned drugs
Alpha-2 blockers
Phenol ethers
Phenylpiperazines
Phthalimides